The 12th Cabinet of North Korea was elected by the 1st Session of the 12th Supreme People's Assembly on 9 April 2009. It was replaced on 9 April 2014 by the 13th Cabinet.

Members

References

Citations

Bibliography
Books:
 

12th Supreme People's Assembly
Cabinet of North Korea
2009 establishments in North Korea
2014 disestablishments in North Korea